The governor of Missouri is the head of government of the U.S. state of Missouri and the commander-in-chief of the  Missouri National Guard. The governor has a duty to enforce state laws and the power to either approve or veto bills passed by the Missouri Legislature, to convene the legislature and grant pardons, except in cases of impeachment.

The following is a list of governors of Missouri since its territory became part of the United States.

Missouri was part of the Louisiana Purchase, which the United States purchased from France in 1803.  In its first year it was part of Louisiana.  In 1804 all of the territory above what is modern-day Louisiana was broken off and administered by a governor based in St. Louis, Missouri until statehood.

Prior to the purchase both France and Spain administered the territory in a similar manner.  France initially had a commandant in charge of Upper Louisiana.  Spain around 1770 began having a lieutenant governor in St. Louis and governor in New Orleans, Louisiana ruling the whole territory.  For a list of governors under Spanish and French rule see Louisiana Governor.  For a list of lieutenant governors ruling Upper Louisiana under French and Spanish control see List of commandants of the Illinois Country.

Since the state capitol moved to Jefferson City in 1826 the governor has lived in the Missouri Governor's Mansion a block east of the Missouri State Capitol (although the current mansion is the third one).

Two governors have served non-consecutive terms, Phil M. Donnelly and Kit Bond.

The current governor is Mike Parson, a member of the Republican Party.

Qualifications
Anyone who seeks to be elected Governor of Missouri must meet the following qualifications:
Be at least thirty years old
Be a citizen of the United States for at least 15 years
Be a resident of Missouri for at least 10 years

Governors

Commandant of Louisiana

Governor of the District of Louisiana
On March 26, 1804, an act of congress divided Louisiana into two territories or districts: land south of the 33rd parallel became the Territory of Orleans; land north of the 33rd parallel, the District of Louisiana.  The act took effect October 1, 1804, upon which the District of Louisiana was placed under the governance of Indiana Territory, then governed by William Henry Harrison.

Governors of Louisiana Territory and Missouri Territory
The citizens of the District of Louisiana, unhappy with the governance specified by the act of 1804, set about immediately to petition Congress for a return to a military-style government to which they were accustomed under Spanish rule.  Congress responded by passing an act on March 3, 1805 which changed the name of the District of Louisiana to the Territory of Louisiana.  Power was vested in a governor who was appointed by the president to a term of 3 years.  During times of vacancy, the secretary would act as governor.

On June 4, 1812, the Territory of Louisiana was renamed the Territory of Missouri to avoid confusion with the newly admitted state of Louisiana. Later, Arkansas Territory was separated from the Territory of Missouri on July 4, 1819.

Governors of Missouri

 Parties

Civil War
Missouri, a slave state, was a border state during the Civil War under Union control. However, it was officially recognized as a Confederate state by the Confederate government and was represented in the Confederate Congress and by a star on the Confederate flag. There were two competing governments for the course of the war. The Emancipation Proclamation did not consider Missouri a seceding state, therefore it was not part of Reconstruction. The Missouri Provisional Government is considered the official one on this list.

Missouri secession (Confederate)
1861–1862: Claiborne Jackson
1862–1865: Thomas Caute Reynolds

Missouri Provisional Government (Union)
1861–64: Hamilton Rowan Gamble
1864–65: Willard Preble Hall

Notes

Succession

References 
General

 
 

Constitutions

 
 
 Constitution of Missouri—1820
 Constitution of Missouri—1865
 Constitution of Missouri—1875

Specific

External links

 
Publications by or about the Office of the Governor of Missouri at Internet Archive.

Lists of state governors of the United States
Governors of Missouri
Lists of territorial governors of the United States
Governors